"Brave" is a song by British singer and songwriter Ella Henderson, released as the second single from her second studio album Everything I Didn't Say on 7 January 2022. It was written by Henderson, Fred Ball, Jennifer Decilveo and Jordan Riley, with Riley producing the track. The song peaked at number 42 on the UK Singles Chart.

Background
Henderson first performed the song during a sold-out show at Hoxton Hall in London in November 2019, and then during a "Live at Home" concert for Billboard in April 2020. A press release stated the song is about "shaking the stigma of needing help and embracing someone’s support for you when you need them most".

Following the song's release, Henderson dedicated it to 16-year-old Scottish singer Paige Dougall, with whom she collaborated on the song "I'm Going Through Hell" in October 2021. Dougall died of Ewing's sarcoma cancer just after the release of "Brave" in January 2022.

Music video
The music video was released the same day as the song and was directed by Plum Stupple-Harris. It depicts the hardships faced by a single mother in her everyday life.

Track listing
Digital download/streaming
"Brave" – 3:21

Digital single – acoustic
"Brave" (acoustic) – 3:49

Digital remix single
"Brave" (Luca Schreiner remix) – 2:49

Personnel and credits

Song
Credits adapted from Everything I Didn't Say album booklet.

Recording locations
Breakfast Studios; London, UK
Metropolis Studios; London, UK

Personnel
Jennifer Decilveo – additional producer, background vocals
Ella Henderson – lead and background vocals
Stuart Hawkes – audio mastering
Sam de Jong – additional production, additional programming
Jay Renolds – mixing
Jordan Riley – production, engineer, drums, bass, organ, Farfisa, guitar, bass, programming

Music video
Adapted from official music video on YouTube.

Connor Adam – director of photography
Victoria Adcock – artist stylist
Miles Berkley-Smith – editor
Tomás Brice – director of photography
Jodie Charman – production assistant
Joseph Crone – SA stylist
Jon Dobson @Wash – grade
Bridget Gardiner – SA make-up artist
Pól Gill – first associate director
Talor Hanson – producer
Kofi Jr – production manager
Aimée Kelly – actor (plays "Alice")
Lisa Laudat – make-up artist
Ginger McRae – SA stylist assistant
Kingsley Meadham – actor (plays "Zach")
Josephine Melville – actor (plays "social worker")
OB Management – production company
Plum Stupple-Harris – director
Katie Prescott – SA hair
Louis Tarbuck – art director
Hilary Whelan – actor (plays "kind lady")
Yellow Fish Group – production company

Charts

Certifications

Release history

References

2022 singles
2022 songs
Ella Henderson songs
Songs written by Ella Henderson
Songs written by Jennifer Decilveo
Songs written by Jordan Riley